Blatné is a mid-sized village in Senec District in the Bratislava Region of western Slovakia, about 5 km north of Senec.  It lies on the fork of roads connecting Senec with Trnava and Senec with Modra and Pezinok.  Currently, the village has around 1,500 inhabitants.

History
The name of the village, Blatné, was derived from the Slovak word for mud, Blato. The area around the town has been very flat and muddy, thus the name.  Prior to 1948, the village has often been referred to as Šarfia, an approximate Hungarian translation. Even though the current name has been officially established in 1948 and the town has a negligible Hungarian minority, most inhabitants still refer to the village as Šarfia.

Recent archeological digs found marks of habitation as early as sixth millennium BC. In addition to habitation marks, a burial ground was found. In 2001, another burial ground, this time from Bronze Age, was found.

The first written reference to Blatné was made in the 13th century. In 1390, a Gothic church was built. It survived until today, after an extensive baroque renovation in the 18th century.  The town also boasts a number of religious sculptures, dating from 1736 (John of Nepomuk), 1801 (main cemetery cross), 1801 (Saint Florian) and more.

Infrastructure and Industry
In the past, Blatné was known for its vineyards. Currently, people grow wine primarily for their own use. The village has several grocery stores and restaurants. In addition, one can find here small firms focusing on car repair, carpentry and the refurbishment of fire extinguishers.

Nearly the entire village has access to water and gas; currently almost a third of the inhabitants is also connected to the town's sewage system, which is still being under construction. The village is preparing 30 plots for new houses, out of which a half is already electrified and has access to water and gas. Blatné also operates a kindergarten and grade school (grades 1 through 8).

Culture and Entertainment
Blatné has a movie theater that operates in summer months (due to lack of heating it is closed in winter). In addition, there is a library and a dance hall. The latter is used for two village-sponsored dances every year. The town is also well known for its folk music group Šarfianka.

The town also features an equestrian course and bowling. A nearby artificial lake is used for water skiing. Blatné's soccer team, Družstevník Blatné, has advanced into the 3rd division of the Slovak soccer league in 2005. Every December 31, the town organizes a cross-country race to the nearest village, Šenkvice, and back.

Demographics
In 2004, there were 1506 inhabitants: 801 women and 705 men. 60% (895) of them were in the productive age category, defined as age 15 to 55 (women) and 15 to 60 (men). 97.3% of inhabitants declared their nationality to be Slovak, and neither of the two largest minorities, Roma and Czech, have approached 1%. 89.8% of inhabitants declared their religion to be Roman Catholic. The only other significant groups were atheists with 5.7%.

Out of the 493 houses in Blatné, 407 were inhabited.

Population by nationality:

See also
 List of municipalities and towns in Slovakia

References

Genealogical resources

The records for genealogical research are available at the state archive "Statny Archiv in Bratislava, Slovakia"

 Roman Catholic church records (births/marriages/deaths): 1850-1923 (parish A)
 Lutheran church records (births/marriages/deaths): 1786-1896 (parish B)

External links

 Official home page
Surnames of living people in Blatne

Villages and municipalities in Senec District